Harper Tavern is an unincorporated community in East Hanover Township in Lebanon County, Pennsylvania, United States. Harper Tavern is located at the intersection of Pennsylvania Route 934 and Jonestown Road along Swatara Creek.

Notable people

Drew Massey, a puppeteer for the Jim Henson Company
Lindley Murray, a Quaker grammarian

References

Unincorporated communities in Lebanon County, Pennsylvania
Unincorporated communities in Pennsylvania